Airborne or Airborn may refer to:

Arts, entertainment, and media

Films
 Airborne (1962 film), a 1962 American film directed by James Landis
 Airborne (1993 film), a comedy–drama film
 Airborne (1998 film), an action film starring Steve Guttenberg
 Airborne (2012 film), a horror film

Games
 Airborne!, a 1985 computer game by Silicon Beach Software
 Airborne Ranger, a 1987 computer game by Microprose
 Asphalt 8: Airborne, a 2013 video game
 Medal of Honor: Airborne, a 2007 video game

Literature
Airborn (novel), a 2004 young adult novel by Kenneth Oppel
Airborn (Hijos del aire), a poetry collection by Octavio Paz, English translation Charles Tomlinson 1981

Music

Groups
 Airbourne (band), an Australian hard rock band
 The Airborne Toxic Event, an indie rock band

Albums
 Airborn (album)
 Airborne (Curved Air album), 1976
 Airborne (Don Felder album)
 Airborne (The Flying Burrito Brothers album), 1976
 Airborne, an album by Erik Wøllo

Songs
 "Airborne", a song by Amplifier from their 2004 album Amplifier
 "Airborne", a song by Cinerama from their 2002 album Torino
 "Airborne", a song by Jaga Jazzist from their 2001 album A Livingroom Hush

Other uses in arts, entertainment, and media
 Airborne (G.I. Joe), a fictional character in the G.I. Joe universe
 "Airborne" (House), a 2007 episode of House, M.D.

Other uses
 Airborne (dietary supplement), a vitamin dietary supplement
 Airborne (horse) (1943–1962), British Thoroughbred racehorse
 Airborne, the takeoff of an aircraft in aviation

See also
 Airbourne (disambiguation)